The Doumeira Islands are situated northeast of Djibouti and east of Eritrea near the Bab el-Mandeb in the Red Sea. They consist of Doumeira, located less than one kilometer off of the Eritrean and Djiboutian shore, and the much smaller island of Kallîda, which is 250 meters to the east.

History
The currently-in-force 1900 boundary agreement specifies that the international boundary starts at Cape Doumeira (Ras Doumeira) at the Red Sea and runs for 1.5 km along the watershed divide of the peninsula. Furthermore, the 1900 protocol specified that Ile Doumeira (Doumeira Island) immediately offshore and its adjacent smaller islets would not be assigned sovereignty and would remain a demilitarized neutral zone.

In January 1935, Italy and France signed the Franco-Italian Agreement wherein parts of French Somaliland (Djibouti) were given to Italy (Eritrea). However, the question of ratification has brought this agreement, and its provision of substantial parts of Djibouti to Eritrea, into question. In April 1996 the two countries almost went to war after a Djibouti official accused Eritrea of shelling Ras Doumeira.

References

Disputed islands
Islands of Djibouti
Territorial disputes of Djibouti
Territorial disputes of Eritrea
Djibouti–Eritrea relations